Micki & Maude is a 1984 American romantic comedy film directed by Blake Edwards and starring Dudley Moore. It co-stars Tony Award-winning actress and dancer Ann Reinking as Micki and Amy Irving as Maude.

With the exception of appearances as herself, as in the documentary Mad Hot Ballroom in 2005, this was Reinking's last acting role in a film.

In India, this film was remade in Tamil as Rettai Vaal Kuruvi starring Mohan, Archana, and Rathika Sarathkumar, and directed by Balu Mahindra. It was also remade in Malayalam as Paavakoothu (1990) starring Jayaram, Parvathy and Ranjini. Tamil version was dubbed in Telugu as Rendu Thokala Pitta.

Plot
Rob Salinger (Dudley Moore) is an overworked television reporter. He is happily married to Micki (Ann Reinking), a lawyer who is a candidate to become a judge. Rob wants a child badly, but Micki is reluctant due to a previous miscarriage and wanting to focus on her career. On an assignment, Rob interviews a young cellist, Maude Guillory (Amy Irving). He is smitten with her and begins a relationship with her. When she becomes pregnant, the two decide to get married, with Maude and her father, professional wrestler Barkhas Guillory (Hard Boiled Haggerty) planning the wedding.

Rob prepares to confess to Micki and get a divorce. But before he can reveal his affair with Maude, Micki stuns him by announcing that she, too, is pregnant. She confesses that she initially planned on having an abortion as pregnancy would interfere with her career and not tell him, but realized how much she wants to have a family with him. However, she cannot exert or stress herself too much as it would endanger her and the baby. Rob becomes a bigamist. With his television boss and best friend Leo (Richard Mulligan) covering for him, he sees one wife during the daytime and the other at night, using work as an excuse. He gets away with it until the fates collide: Micki and Maude going into labor at the same time, in the same hospital, on the same floor.

The two women end up becoming friends, but realizing that Rob had been dishonest with them, they ban Rob from their lives and the lives of the children. Rob follows them around, spying on both families from a distance. Eventually, Rob reconciles with both Micki and Maude, though it is not clear if the two women are aware he has reconciled with the other. The film ends with the women pursuing their careers: Micki as a judge presiding in a courtroom, Maude playing cello in a symphony orchestra. The film closes with a shot of Rob in a park years later, with two babies and his six other children he has had over the years with Micki and Maude.

Cast

Production
The script was written by playwright Jonathan Reynolds. "I initially thought that the guy would be perceived as terrible," said Reynolds. "The biggest trick was to make him not be a swine. If you'd had Errol Flynn or Warren Beatty in that role you would've been in big trouble." So Reynolds stressed the man's devotion to children and to make it clear he was very much in love with both wives.

Blake Edwards was not originally available to direct. When Edwards left City Heat he moved on to Micki and Maude. "I feel I do my best work with him," said Moore. "He lets me go. He doesn't force me to feel that I'm not doing the right thing."

The original version was set in New York and Reynolds says it was "sort of a slam-bang farce, with a very zippy pace." The director, said Reynolds, made it "much sweeter", slowed the pace and introduced the idea of one wife having a wrestler father. H.B. Haggerty was subsequently cast as the father-in-law.

Along with Haggerty, the film features cameos from professional wrestlers Gene LeBell, Chief Jay Strongbow, Big John Studd, and André the Giant. Although the main cast also includes Wallace Shawn, it would not be until The Princess Bride in which he and André would work together onscreen.

Amy Irving later stated, "The role was difficult for me. It's not my forte to do comedy. You feel so exposed when you first try to do it, afraid that you'll appear ridiculous."

Filming began in April 1984. A month of shooting was left to do when Edwards fell ill with mononucleosis. Lou Antonio was brought in to complete the film and was credited as an Executive Producer. Nonetheless, the film came $1.6 million under budget.

Reception
The film was a box office disappointment, although it grossed $26.2 million against a budget of $15.1 million. The critical reception was mixed to positive. On review aggregator Rotten Tomatoes, the film has an approval rating of 70% based on 10 reviews, with an average score of 5.60/10. On Metacritic, the film received a score of 64 based on 11 reviews, indicating "generally favorable reviews".

Awards and nominations
In 1985, Moore won the Golden Globe award for Best Performance by an Actor in a Motion Picture - Comedy/Musical. The film was also Golden Globe-nominated for Best Motion Picture - Comedy/Musical.

Home video
Micki and Maude was released on VHS in 1985 and 1989 by RCA/Columbia Pictures Home Video and re-released in 1993 by Columbia TriStar Home Video. The DVD was released on November 3, 2003 by Columbia TriStar Home Entertainment.

References

External links
 
 
 
 
 

1980s English-language films
1980s pregnancy films
1984 films
1984 romantic comedy films
American pregnancy films
American romantic comedy films
Columbia Pictures films
Fictional married couples
Films about polygamy
Films directed by Blake Edwards
Films featuring a Best Musical or Comedy Actor Golden Globe winning performance
Films scored by Lee Holdridge
Films set in Los Angeles
1980s American films